"Bananaman" is a British animated comedy series which ran from 1983 to 1986. It was based on the comic strip character Bananaman and each of the show's roughly five-minute episodes featured the voices of The Goodies (Tim Brooke-Taylor, Graeme Garden and Bill Oddie).

Parts of the character were changed for the series: he was now called Eric Twinge (rather than Eric Wimp), had a distinctive banana-shaped hairstyle rather than punk stubble, and had a love interest (only when transformed) in the form of Fiona, a newsreader.

Cast
Tim Brooke-Taylor as Eric
Graeme Garden as Bananaman 
Bill Oddie as Crow
Jill Shilling as Fiona
Written by Bernie Kay.
Produced by Trevor Bond.
Directed by Terry Ward.

Reception
Bananaman was a popular cartoon and is one of the most well known British Superheroes. Taken from the D.C.Thomson comic entitled, NUTTY. It was made into a TV animated series of 40 x 5 minute episodes by Terry Ward of Flicks Films Ltd.

References

External links
 
 
Episode guide

1983 British television series debuts
1986 British television series endings
1980s British children's television series
1980s British animated television series
1980s Nickelodeon original programming
British children's animated adventure television series
British children's animated comedy television series
British children's animated superhero television series
English-language television shows
BBC children's television shows
Australian Broadcasting Corporation original programming
Nickelodeon original programming
HIT Entertainment